Sankalp Reddy (born October 20, 1984) is an Indian film director, and screenwriter who primarily works in Telugu films. He made his directorial debut with the war film Ghazi (2017) which won the National Film Award for Best Feature Film in Telugu. Reddy later directed science fiction film Antariksham 9000 KMPH (2018).

Early life
Sankalp Reddy was born and brought up in Hyderabad. He graduated from CVR College of Engineering and moved to Australia for his MBA at Griffith University, Brisbane. He later dropped out after a semester and joined Griffith Film School, a top creative arts school in Australia, for pursuing MFA in film direction.

Career 
Reddy researched about submarines about a year and decided to make a film on submarine. Later, he wrote a book titled The Blue Fish to keep the copyrights to make a film with himself. It later marked his feature film debut with Ghazi (2017). The film is inspired by true events from the Indo-Pakistani war of 1971. The submarine warfare film is an underwater tale of the courage and patriotism of the men aboard the Indian Submarine  which destroyed the Pakistani  when it ventured into Indian waters to destroy  on the shore of R. K. Beach, Visakhapatnam. Ghazi was screened at the Jagran Film Festival, and garnered the National Film Award for Best Feature Film in Telugu at the 65th National Film Awards 2018. 

In 2018, Reddy directed the space thriller film Antariksham 9000 KMPH, starring Varun Tej.

Filmography

Awards

References

External links
 

Living people
Telugu film directors
1987 births
Hindi-language film directors
Indian experimental filmmakers
Indian casting directors
Indian male screenwriters
Film directors from Telangana
National Film Award (India) winners
Screenwriters from Telangana
21st-century Indian film directors
Santosham Film Awards winners
Griffith Film School